Khedbrahma is one of the 182 Legislative Assembly constituencies of Gujarat state in India. It is part of Sabarkantha district and is reserved for candidates belonging to the Scheduled Tribes.

This assembly seat represents the following segments,

 Khedbrahma Taluka
 Vijaynagar Taluka

Members of Vidhan Sabha

Election results

2022

2017

2012

1995
 Amarsinh Bhilabhai Chaudhari (INC) : 59,822 votes   
 Bara, Becharbhai Khatuji (BJP) : 33,310

See also
 List of constituencies of the Gujarat Legislative Assembly
 Sabarkantha district

References

External links
 

Assembly constituencies of Gujarat
Sabarkantha district
Khedbrahma